Artigasus is a genus of robber flies in the family Asilidae.

Species
 Artigasus concepcionensis (Bromley, 1932)
 Artigasus schlingeri (Artigas, 1982)
 Artigasus veredus (Artigas, 1970)

References

Further reading

External links

 
 

Asilidae genera